Manulea nankingica is a moth of the family Erebidae. It is found in the Russian Far East (Primorye), China (Jiangsu), Korea and Japan.

References

Moths described in 1954
Lithosiina
Moths of Japan